Chaetopappa bellidifolia ,  called the Edwards lazy daisy, or whiteray leastdaisy, is a North American species of plants in the family Asteraceae. It has been found only in central Texas, largely in the Edwards Plateau.

It i typically found in open calcareous areas, in habitats such as stream bottoms and hillsides.

References

External links
photo of herbarium specimen at Missouri Botanical Garden, collected in Texas in 1846, type specimen for Chaetopappa bellidifolia/Keerlia bellidifolia/Bourdonia bellidifolia
Image Archive of Central Texas Plants

bellidifolia
Endemic flora of Texas
Taxa named by Asa Gray
Taxa named by George Engelmann
Plants described in 1846
Flora without expected TNC conservation status